Brigadier Reginald Howlett  (1882 – 20 October 1942) was a British Army officer who became colonel of the Royal Fusiliers.

Military career
Howlett was commissioned as a second lieutenant in The Royal Fusiliers (City of London Regiment) on 11 August 1900. He saw active service in South Africa during the Second Boer War, and was invalided home three months after the end of the war, in September 1902. He returned to regular service with his regiment in November 1902.

He served in the First World War latterly as commanding officer of the 10th (Service) Battalion, Green Howards and then as commanding officer of the 12th (Service) Battalion, Northumberland Fusiliers. He became commanding officer of 2nd Battalion, Royal Fusiliers in 1928, Commander of the 162nd Brigade in 1932 and Commanding Officer of the British troops in Jamaica in 1936 before retiring in 1939. He also served as colonel of the Royal Fusiliers.

References

External links
Generals of World War II

Royal Fusiliers officers
1882 births
1942 deaths
Commanders of the Order of the British Empire
Companions of the Distinguished Service Order
Recipients of the Military Cross
British Army personnel of the Second Boer War
British Army personnel of World War I
Green Howards officers
Royal Northumberland Fusiliers officers
British Army brigadiers of World War II